Dern Rutlidge (or DernRutlidge) is a stoner rock band from Melbourne, Australia. Formed around 1998 by Jason Miszewski and Craig Westwood from Christbait, Jason PC from Blood Duster and Callan O'Hara from Drool. They were named after two characters in a Jack Daniels' ad.

Dern Rutlidge released one full-length album which was well received by critics. Beat magazine gave it their Album of the Week, The Age gave it 3.5* and Hellride Music gave it 9/10. The first single from the album, "Lines on the Table", was placed on high rotation on Triple J and they played a live set for Triple J's Home and Hosed program.

Band members
Jason "P.C." Fuller - bass
Craig Westwood - vocals, guitar
Jason Miszewski - guitar
Callan O'Hara - drums

Discography

Albums:

EPs and Singles:

References

http://www.craigwestwood.com

Musical groups established in 1998
Victoria (Australia) musical groups
Australian stoner rock musical groups